A Soldier's Duty is a film produced by the Edison Company in 1912.

Release
The film was released in the United States on October 19, 1912, and remained in circulation on US screens through at least the following January.

References

External links
 

1912 films
1912 short films
1910s war drama films
American war drama films
American black-and-white films
American Civil War films
Films directed by Charles Brabin
American silent short films
1912 drama films
1910s American films
Silent American drama films
Silent war drama films
1910s English-language films